The Keflavík women's basketball team, commonly known as Keflavík, is the women's basketball department of Keflavík ÍF (Keflavík, íþrótta- og ungmennafélag), based in the town of Reykjanesbær in Iceland. It is Iceland's most successful women's basketball team with 16 national championship. They currently play in Úrvalsdeild kvenna where they won the national championship in 2017. The club has won the Icelandic Basketball Cup a record fifteen times, including in 2017 and 2018.

Arena
Keflavík plays its home games at the TM Arena, commonly nicknamed "The Slaughterhouse".

Trophies and awards

Trophies 
Icelandic champions: (16):
1988–1990, 1992–1994, 1996, 1998, 2000, 2003–2005, 2008, 2011, 2013, 2017
Icelandic Basketball Cup: (15):
1988–1990, 1993–1998, 2000, 2004, 2011, 2013, 2017, 2018
Icelandic Basketball Supercup: (11):
1996, 2000, 2001, 2003–2005, 2007, 2008, 2013, 2017, 2018
Icelandic Company Cup: (7):
2002, 2003, 2004, 2007, 2008, 2010, 2014
1. deild kvenna:
1985

Awards
Úrvalsdeild Women's Domestic Player of the Year
 Anna María Sveinsdóttir – 1988, 1989, 1995, 1996, 1998, 1999
 Björg Hafsteinsdóttir – 1990
 Erla Þorsteinsdóttir – 2000
 Pálína Gunnlaugsdóttir – 2008, 2012, 2013
 Olga Færseth – 1994
 Thelma Dís Ágústsdóttir – 2017

Úrvalsdeild Women's Foreign Player of the Year
 Ariana Moorer – 2017
 Brittanny Dinkins – 2019
 Daniela Wallen – 2021
 Jacquline Adamshick – 2011
 Jennifer Boucek – 1998
 Reshea Bristol – 2005
 TeKesha Watson – 2008

Úrvalsdeild Women's Domestic All-First Team
 Alda Leif Jónsdóttir – 2000
 Anna María Sveinsdóttir – 1988, 1989, 1990, 1991, 1992, 1995, 1996, 1997, 1998, 1999
 Björg Hafsteinsdóttir – 1988, 1989, 1990, 1991, 1992, 1995
 Birna Valgarðsdóttir – 1997, 2002, 2003, 2004, 2005, 2006, 2009, 2010, 2011
 Bryndís Guðmundsdóttir – 2005, 2007, 2011, 2013, 2014, 2015, 2019
 Erla Reynisdóttir – 1997, 1998
 Erla Þorsteinsdóttir – 1998, 2000, 2002, 2003, 2004
 Emelía Ósk Gunnarsdóttir – 2017
 Kristín Blöndal – 1993
 Olga Færseth – 1993, 1994
 Margrét Kara Sturludóttir – 2007
 María Ben Erlingsdóttir – 2006, 2007
 Marín Rós Karlsdóttir – 2001
 Pálína Gunnlaugsdóttir – 2008, 2011, 2012, 2013
 Sara Rún Hinriksdóttir – 2015, 
 Thelma Dís Ágústsdóttir – 2017, 2018

Úrvalsdeild Women's Young Player of the Year
 Birna Valgerður Benónýsdóttir – 2017, 2019
 Bryndís Guðmundsdóttir – 2005
 Erla Reynisdóttir – 1995
 Margrét Kara Sturludóttir – 2007
 María Ben Erlingsdóttir – 2004, 2006
 Sara Rún Hinriksdóttir – 2013, 2016
 Thelma Dís Ágústsdóttir – 2017

Úrvalsdeild kvenna Coach of the Year
 Anna María Sveinsdóttir – 2002
 Jón Halldór Eðvaldsson – 2008, 2011
 Sigurður Ingimundarson – 2013
 Sverrir Þór Sverrisson – 2017

Notable players

Coaches

Source

References

External links
 Official website
 Club info at kki.is

Keflavík (basketball)